The 1922 Women's World Games (French Jeux Olympiques Féminins, also "Women’s Olympic Games") were the first regular international Women's World Games and the first Track and field competitions for women. The tournament was held on a single day on August 20, 1922. at the  Pershing Stadium in Paris.

Events
The games were organized by the Fédération Sportive Féminine Internationale under Alice Milliat as a response to the refusal of the International Olympic Committee refusal to include women's events in the 1924 Olympic Games.

The games were attended by 77 participants from 5 nations: Czechoslovakia, France (32 athletes), Great Britain, Switzerland and the USA (13 athletes). Members of the American team were: Kathryn Agar, Florieda Batson, Maybelle Gilliland, Lucile Godbold, Esther Green, Ann Harwick, Frances Mead, Maud Rosenbaum, Camille Sabie, Janet Snow, Elizabeth Stine, Louise Voorhees and Nancy Voorhees.

The athletes competed in 11 events: running (60 metres, 100 yards, 300 metres, 1000 metres, 4 x 110 yards relay and hurdling 100 yards), high jump, long jump, standing long jump, javelin and shot put.

The tournament was opened with an olympic style ceremony. The games attended an audience of 20,000 spectators and 18 world records were set.

Medal summary

 Each athlete in the shot put and javelin throw events threw using their right hand, then their left. Their final mark was the total of the best mark with their right-handed throw and the best mark with their left-handed throw.

Points table

References

External links
 Film from the 1922 Women's World Games
 Mixed pictures from the Women's World Games
 Picture of the American team

Women's World Games
Athletics in Paris
International athletics competitions hosted by France
Women's World Games
Women's World Games
Women's World Games
World Games
Women's World Games
International sports competitions hosted by Paris